Gareth Griffiths may refer to:
Gareth Griffiths (footballer) (born 1970), English former footballer
Gareth Griffiths (rugby union) (1931–2016), Welsh rugby union player
Gareth Griffiths (academic) (born 1943), Australian professor
Gareth Griffiths, a character in Fireman Sam